Andorra competed at the 2022 Winter Paralympics in Beijing, China which took place between 4–13 March 2022.

Competitors
The following is the list of number of competitors participating at the Games per sport/discipline.

Alpine skiing

Andorra sent one alpine skier to compete in the Games.

See also
Andorra at the Paralympics
Andorra at the 2022 Winter Olympics

References

Nations at the 2022 Winter Paralympics
2022
Winter Paralympics